Municipal elections were held in France on 14 and 21 March 1965. As in 1959, the UDR realized deceiving results (although they did moderately gain). The Communists gained, but they also came out of their isolation and started co-operating with other parties of the parliamentary left.

Sources

History of French Local Elections

1965
1965 elections in France